The 2012 UCLA Bruins men's soccer team played the college's 77th season of organized men's college soccer. 2012 was the team's third full season in the Pac-12 Conference; it had previously played as an independent team. The team won the Pac-12 Conference championship, but fell to the University of San Diego in the NCAA Tournament.

Competitions

Preseason

Regular season

Results summary

Results by round

Match reports

NCAA Tournament

See also

References 

Ucla Bruins
UCLA Bruins men's soccer seasons
Ucla Bruins
UCLA Bruins
UCLA Bruins